Macherla railway station (station code: MCLA), is an Indian Railways station in Macherla of Andhra Pradesh. It lies on the Nadikudi–Macherla branch line and is administered under Guntur railway division of South Central Railway zone.

See also 
 List of railway stations in India

References 

Railway stations in Guntur district
Railway stations in Guntur railway division